Maité Allamand (29 October 1911 – 3 January 1996) was a Chilean writer and diplomat. Born Jeanne Dominique Marie Therese Allamand Madaune to a French family based in Chile, she was an influential figure in the early development of children's literature in that country. She was the director of the PEN Club and a member of the International Board on Books for Young People (IBBY). She received several awards, including the 1962 Municipal Prize of Santiago in the short story category and the 1969 IBBY CRAV prize.

Biography
Maité Allamand spent her childhood in the countryside on the banks of the Maule River, after her father's job transferred him there. This rural environment influenced her later work. In 1920 she enrolled in the Sacred Heart College of Talca, where she learned to speak and read Spanish.

After finishing her education, Allamand worked in the legation to Belgium, thanks to her mastery of French. She remained in this position from 1932 until 1940, when she married the doctor and researcher Luis Hervé.

Select bibliography
 1933 - Cosas de campo
 1936 - Parvas viejas
 1944 - Renovales
 1950 - Alamito el Largo
 1960 - El funeral del diablo
 1966 - Huellas en la ciudad
 1969 - El sueño y la lumbre
 1974 - La niña de las trenzas de lana
 1991 - Cerrín que quería crecer
 1993 - El buzón colorado

References

1911 births
1996 deaths
Chilean diplomats
20th-century Chilean novelists
Chilean women novelists
Chilean people of French descent
Chilean women short story writers
Chilean women children's writers
Writers from Santiago
20th-century Chilean women writers
Chilean women diplomats